The 1970 United States Senate election in Rhode Island took place on November 3, 1970. Incumbent Democratic U.S. Senator John Pastore successfully sought re-election, defeating Republican John McLaughlin. This was the last election when a Democratic was elected to Rhode Island's Class 1 Senate Seat until Sheldon Whitehouse was elected in the 2006 Senate election in Rhode Island.

Democratic primary

Candidates 
John Pastore, incumbent U.S. Senator since 1950
John Quattrocchi

Results

Republican primary

Candidates 
John McLaughlin

General election

Results

References

External links

Rhode Island
1970
1970 Rhode Island elections